Ismu Harinto (born 16 May 1974) is an Indonesian table tennis player. He competed in the men's doubles event at the 2000 Summer Olympics.

References

External links
 

1974 births
Living people
Indonesian male table tennis players
Olympic table tennis players of Indonesia
Table tennis players at the 2000 Summer Olympics
Place of birth missing (living people)
Southeast Asian Games medalists in table tennis
20th-century Indonesian people